The Green Development Initiative (GDI) aims to establish a new marketplace for sustainable landscape management. As a key first step it has established a Platform for Verified Conservation Areas (VCAs) which includes an online Registry, a Standard and a Toolkit The Standard is based on the objectives and approaches of the Convention on Biological Diversity (CBD).

Organisation structure

Steering Committee
The GDI Steering Committee is international and includes representatives from the Governments of the Netherlands and Switzerland, the private sector and NGOs. Its role is to set the overall direction of the Initiative and the review its work programmes.

GDI Office 
Earthmind maintains an office for the GDI at the IUCN Conservation Centre in Switzerland. Work is undertaken by a team of professional consultants and interns. Core funding comes from the Government of the Netherlands and Switzerland..

Phase I: GDM 2010 Initiative 
The GDM 2010 Initiative began in 2009 with aim of bringing forward a discussion on a new financial mechanism for biodiversity at the 10th Conference of the Parties of the (COP 10).  The Conference took place in October 2010 in Nagoya, Japan. The aim of the Initiative was to explore the possibility of establishing an international  mechanism which would be voluntary, transparent and accountable so as to secure additional financial resources from the private sector for biodiversity. During Phase 1, extensive consultations were undertaken.

Phase II: Green Development Initiative 
Following the consultations leading up to CBD COP10 in October 2010, a new phase was launched to develop and text a promising modalities for a green development mechanism. The focus of the Green Development Initiative (GDI) was to establish a biodiversity standard and certification scheme for land management which will facilitate financial support for conservation and development action on the ground.

In many ways the GDI shares the same ethos as UNEP’s Green Economy Initiative (GEI), which is “a project designed to communicate that the greening of economies is not a burden on growth but rather a new engine for growth, employment, and the reduction of persistent global poverty.” In this respect, the GDI is aiming to certify positive biodiversity outcomes in terms of conservation and development for geographically-defined areas.

Phase III: VCA Platform
The third phase is the implementation of the GDI.  Phase III established the GDI Office at the IUCN Conservation Centre and launched the online Platform for Verified Conservation Areas (VCAs).

GDI Expert Meetings 
Since 2009, there have been 5 GDI Expert Meetings to explore and review the development of a new approach to financing biodiversity conservation. These took place in the Netherlands (2009), Indonesia (2010), Kenya (2011), Brazil (2012), and Switzerland (2013).

References

External links 
Green Development Initiative (GDI)
GDM 2010 Initiative
VCA Platform
 VCA Toolkit
CBD Financial Resources and Mechanism

International environmental organizations
Nature conservation organisations based in Europe
Non-profit organisations based in Switzerland